Madison La'akea Te-Lan Hall Chock (born July 2, 1992) is an American ice dancer. With her skating partner, Evan Bates, she is a 2022 Olympic team event silver medalist, a three-time World medalist (silver in 2015, bronze in 2016 and 2022), a four-time Grand Prix Final silver medalist (2014–15, 2015–16, 2019–20, 2022–23), a three-time Four Continents champion (2019, 2020, 2023), and a four-time U.S. national champion (2015, 2020, 2022, 2023). She is a three-time Olympian, having represented the United States at the 2014, 2018, and 2022 Winter Olympics.

With former partner Greg Zuerlein, Chock is the 2009 World Junior champion, 2008 JGP Final champion, and 2011 U.S. national bronze medalist. They competed together from 2006 to 2011.

Personal life 
Madison La'akea Te-Lan Hall Chock was born in Redondo Beach, California. She went to Novi High School. She is of Chinese-Hawaiian descent on her father's side and European descent on her mother's side. La'akea means "sacred light from heaven" and Te-Lan (德蘭) means "virtuous orchid." 

After partnering on ice for several years, Chock and Bates began a romantic relationship in 2017. On June 11, 2022 they became engaged.

Early career 

Madison Chock began skating at age five, becoming interested after watching it on TV with her parents. Ice dancing was suggested to her at the age of 12, and she found that she enjoyed it, although she initially had no interest in dance. She also tried pair skating and took tests through the intermediate level.

Chock skated for one season with Kurt Lingenfelter on the intermediate level. They won the pewter medal at the 2006 U.S. Junior Championships.

First two seasons with Zuerlein 
Chock teamed up with ice dancer Greg Zuerlein in June 2006. They placed fifth in the novice division at the 2007 U.S. Championships. They began working with Igor Shpilband and Marina Zueva in 2007.

Making their Junior Grand Prix debut, Chock/Zuerlein won gold in September 2007 in Tallinn, Estonia. With a bronze medal at their second event, in Chemnitz, Germany, they qualified to the ISU Junior Grand Prix Final in Gdańsk, Poland, where they placed fifth. They received the junior bronze medal at the 2008 U.S. Championships.

2008–2009 season: World Junior title 
In December 2008, Chock/Zuerlein won gold at the Junior Grand Prix Final in Goyang, South Korea, where they finished ahead of silver medalists Hubbell/Hubbell by 6.47 points.

They won the junior title in January at the 2009 U.S. Championships. They capped off their season by becoming World Junior champions in Sofia, Bulgaria. They outscored silver medalists Shibutani/Shibutani by 10.40 points.

2009–2010 season 
Chock/Zuerlein moved up to the senior level. Making their Grand Prix debut, they placed sixth at the 2009 Skate America and eighth at the 2009 Cup of China. They finished 5th in their senior national debut in January 2010. Later that month, they were sent to the 2010 Four Continents Championships in Jeonju, South Korea, where they had the same result.

2010–2011 season 
Chock/Zuerlein won their first senior Grand Prix medal, bronze, at the 2010 Skate Canada International and followed it up with bronze at the 2010 Trophée Éric Bompard. They won their first senior national medal, bronze, at the 2011 U.S. Championships. After placing fifth again at Four Continents, they finished ninth in their first and only appearance at the World Championships, setting personal best scores in both segments of the competition.

On June 7, 2011, Chock and Zuerlein announced the end of their five-year partnership; Zuerlein retired from competition, while Chock said she intended to continue competing.

Chock and Bates

2011–2012 season: First season with Bates 
On July 1, 2011, Chock and Evan Bates announced their partnership and that they would continue to be coached by Shpilband and Zueva. They finished fourth at the 2011 Skate Canada International, fifth at the 2011 Trophée Éric Bompard, and 5th at the 2012 U.S. Championships. After Zueva and Shpilband ended their coaching partnership, Chock/Bates were the first team to announce that they would continue training with Shpilband.

2012–2013 season 
Chock/Bates finished fourth at the 2012 U.S. International Classic and then won gold at the 2012 Nebelhorn Trophy. They then competed at the 2012 Cup of China and finished fourth. At the 2013 U.S. Nationals, Chock/Bates were able to win the silver medal ahead of Shibutani/Shibutani. They were named in the U.S. team to the 2013 Four Continents, where they won the bronze medal. They finished seventh overall at the 2013 World Championships. Chock/Bates competed at the 2013 World Team Trophy and placed first in ice dance, helping Team USA win the team gold for the first time since 2009.

2013–2014 season: First Olympics 
Chock/Bates were assigned to two Grand Prix events, the 2013 Cup of China and 2013 Rostelecom Cup, and won bronze at both. They won the silver medal at the 2014 U.S. Championships and were named in the U.S. Olympic team. They finished eighth at the 2014 Winter Olympics in Sochi, Russia.

Chock/Bates placed fourth in the short dance, fifth in the free, and fifth overall at the 2014 World Championships in Saitama, Japan.

2014–2015 season: World silver medal 
Chock/Bates took silver at the 2014 Nebelhorn Trophy, an ISU Challenger Series event, and then won both their Grand Prix events at the 2014 Skate America and 2014 Rostelecom Cup. The team went on to win the silver at the Grand Prix Final in December and then their first senior national title at the 2015 U.S. Championships in January.

In February, Chock/Bates won silver at the 2015 Four Continents Championships in Seoul, where they finished second to Canada's Weaver/Poje by a margin of 1.28 points. In March, they capped off their season with silver at the 2015 World Championships in Shanghai, China. Ranked first in the short dance and second in the free, they finished with a total score 2.94 points less than the champions, Papadakis/Cizeron of France, and 1.92 more than the bronze medalists, Weaver/Poje.

2015–2016 season: World bronze medal 
Chock/Bates won gold at the 2015 Nebelhorn Trophy, again an ISU Challenger Series event. At the event, they received comments that "Dark Eyes" was not suitable for a polka rhythm. They changed the short dance music to "More" and "Unchained Melody" to clarify the rhythms, and won the gold at the 2015 Skate America followed by a silver at 2015 Cup of China. They then won the silver medal at the 2015–16 Grand Prix Final in Barcelona, behind Canadians Weaver/Poje.

In March, Chock/Bates won the bronze medal at the 2016 World Championships in Boston, having finished third behind Papadakis/Cizeron and Shibutani/Shibutani in both segments.

2016–2017 season
Chock/Bates began their season with silver medals at four international events, the 2016 CS Nebelhorn Trophy, 2016 CS Ondrej Nepela Memorial, 2016 Skate Canada International, and 2016 Rostelecom Cup. In December, they placed sixth in the short dance, fourth in the free, and sixth overall at the Grand Prix Final in Marseille, France. In January, they ranked second in the short dance and first in the free dance at the 2017 U.S. Championships, losing overall to the Shibutanis by 1.01.

Chock/Bates took the bronze medal at the 2017 Four Continents Championships in Gangneung, South Korea, where they finished behind Canada's Virtue/Moir and the Shibutanis. They finished seventh overall (fourth in the short, eighth in the free) at the 2017 World Championships in Helsinki, Finland.

2017–2018 season: Second Olympics
Chock competed with an injury after bone fragments chipped off her right ankle in August 2017, just before Champs Camp. She and Bates won silver medals at the 2017 Cup of China and 2017 Internationaux de France, which meant that they qualified to their fourth consecutive Grand Prix Final. They placed fifth in the short dance, third in the free, and fifth overall at the December event in Nagoya, Japan.

At the 2018 U.S. Championships, Chock/Bates placed third in the short dance, first in the free dance, and third overall, scoring 0.52 less than the champions, Hubbell/Donohue, and 0.33 less than the Shibutanis. They were not selected for the team competition but competed in the individual ice dancing event at the 2018 Winter Olympics, which took place in February in Gangneung, South Korea. Chock reinjured her ankle in the final moments of the warm-up before the short dance. She stated that it was an "osteochondral lesion" with a loose bone fragment in her joint. The duo placed seventh in the short dance.  Skating their "Imagine" program in the free dance, the blades of their skates caught on the entrance of their combination spin, resulting in both falling and invalidating the entire element. They placed twelfth in the free dance and ninth overall.  Speaking afterward, Chock said that her previous injury was not responsible for the fall and that at that moment, "I knew it was over. I knew there was no shot. After working so hard all this season and going through so much and trying to stay healthy and then just losing it at a crucial moment, it was really, really heartbreaking."

In March, they finished fifth at the 2018 World Championships in Milan, Italy. On April 6, 2018, Chock underwent surgery to remove the loose bone fragments in her right ankle. In late May, Chock/Bates announced a coaching change, stating that they would begin training in the summer with Marie-France Dubreuil, Patrice Lauzon, and Romain Haguenauer in Montreal, Quebec, Canada.

2018–2019 season: Four Continents gold
Chock and Bates were initially assigned to two Grand Prix events, the newly created Helsinki Grand Prix and the Rostelecom Cup.  Chock's recovery from her ankle surgery necessitated their withdrawal, and they did not compete in the first half of the season.

In January, they returned to competition at the Toruń Cup in Poland, winning decisively.  They then competed at the 2019 U.S. Championships in Detroit, where they placed second in both programs, winning the silver medal behind Hubbell/Donohue.  Both praised their new coaches and training environment afterward, with Bates saying they were "really happy with the performance here in Detroit. This self-belief is a belief in each other, our training mates, and coaches, and that is a strength that will carry us back to where we want to go."  They were assigned to compete at the Four Continents and World Championships.

At the Four Continents Championships, held in Anaheim, Chock/Bates placed second in the rhythm dance, again behind Hubbell/Donohue.  They placed first in the free dance and first overall, following a series of errors by Hubbell/Donohue, principally their planned stationary lift being reduced to base value after traveling too much.  This was the team's first gold medal at an ISU Championship, prompting Bates to observe, "we got a lot of medals, none of them are gold.  I am surprised. If you had told us that we would win Four Continents when we pulled out of the Grand Prix four months ago, I think we would be very surprised. But we're very happy now."  Chock stated that she considered the placement secondary to "newfound joy and happiness" in their skating.

Chock/Bates concluded their season at the 2019 World Championships, where they finished sixth.

2019–2020 season: Second Four Continents and national titles
Beginning the season on the Challenger series, Chock/Bates won gold at the 2019 CS U.S. Classic, winning by almost 14 points over silver medalists Carreira/Ponomarenko.  At their second Challenger, the 2019 CS Finlandia Trophy, they won a second gold medal, despite the loss of an element in their free dance.

On the Grand Prix, Chock/Bates began at the 2019 Internationaux de France, where they placed second in the rhythm dance despite hitting only one of the four key points in the Finnstep pattern dance.  Second in the free dance, they also won the silver medal.  The following week at the 2019 Cup of China, they again placed second in the rhythm dance and obtained only one of the four Finnstep key points. Chock/Bates won the free dance decisively, but remained in second place overall. At the Grand Prix Final, Chock/Bates scored a season's best in the rhythm dance, placing third while obtaining three of the four Finnstep key points. They also scored a personal best in the free dance, finishing second in the free dance and second overall, returning to the Grand Prix Final podium for the first time since 2015.  Speaking afterward, Chock attributed much of their success to their Egyptian Snake Dance free program, saying, "there’s no other program like this in ice dance."

At the 2020 US Championships in Greensboro, Chock/Bates finished first in the rhythm dance, 1.02 points ahead of Hubbell/Donohue despite a slip in their Finnstep pattern. After the free dance, they were first overall, winning their second US title five years after their first one, which is the longest gap between ice dance titles in US history. They also won with the largest margin of victory in US ice dance since the Davis/White era, 4.67 points.

At the 2020 Four Continents Championships in Seoul, Chock/Bates finished second in the rhythm dance with a personal best score of 85.76, just 0.2 points behind Hubbell/Donohue. In the free dance, Chock/Bates finished first despite falling on a transition. They successfully defended their Four Continents title, becoming the first ice dance couple to do so since Belbin/Agosto from 2004 to 2006.  Chock/Bates were assigned to compete at the World Championships in Montreal, but these were canceled as a result of the coronavirus pandemic.

2020–2021 season
Chock and Bates remained in Montreal during the pandemic and were off-ice for three months before the rink reopened for training. The duo lost a month of training to an injury to Chock. She suffered a concussion after fainting after a walk on a hot day in July. They spent another two weeks in quarantine due to COVID-19 exposure, though neither tested positive.  As a result, they abandoned plans to use a new free dance for the season and withdrew from the 2020 Skate America.

At the 2021 U.S. Championships, Chock/Bates finished first in the rhythm dance, 0.44 points ahead of Hubbell/Donohue despite Chock losing a twizzle level.  In the free dance, Bates stepped out of his twizzles, resulting in them finishing second in the free dance and overall.  They were named to the US team for the 2021 World Championships in Stockholm.

The Stockholm World Championships were held without an audience due to the pandemic, with Chock/Bates' training partners and four-time World Champions Papadakis/Cizeron declining to attend due to their own COVID illness and lost training time. This led to a hotly contested podium, generally seen as being between six teams, them included.  Chock/Bates placed third in the rhythm dance, narrowly behind Hubbell/Donohue in second and over two points ahead of Canada's Gilles/Poirier in fourth. Bates lost a twizzle level in the free dance.  They placed fourth in that segment, dropping to fourth place overall behind Gilles/Poirier in third. Their fourth place combined with Hubbell/Donohue's second qualified three berths for American dance teams at the 2022 Winter Olympics.

2021–2022 season: Olympic silver, World bronze, and third national title
The team selected a medley of Billie Eilish songs to perform for their rhythm dance while, following the success of their Egyptian Snake Dance program, aimed to replicate that success with a new "Contact" program built around the concept of an astronaut romancing an alien. Making their season debut at the 2021 CS Finlandia Trophy, Chock/Bates won the silver medal behind training mates Papadakis/Cizeron.

On the Grand Prix, Chock/Bates competed first at the 2021 Skate America, also attended by primary domestic rivals Hubbell/Donohue. Placing second in both programs, they won the silver medal after finishing 1.31 points behind Hubbell/Donohue. At their second event, the 2021 NHK Trophy, Chock/Bates placed narrowly second in the rhythm dance, only 0.31 points behind reigning World champions Sinitsina/Katsalapov. Bates fell right at the beginning of the free dance, though not on an element, and they remained in second place. Assessing the error, Bates said afterward, "we responded well and put together a good performance considering the early mishap." Their results qualified them to the Grand Prix Final, but it was subsequently canceled due to restrictions prompted by the Omicron variant.

At the 2022 U.S. Championships, Chock/Bates placed first in the rhythm dance, leading by 2.55 points over Hubbell/Donohue. They placed second in the free dance but won overall by 1.78 points due to their lead in the rhythm dance. They were named to the American Olympic team, the third such for Chock and fourth for Bates. Bates became the first U.S. skater of any discipline to compete in four Winter Olympics.

Chock/Bates began the 2022 Winter Olympics as the team captains and American entries in the free dance segment of the Olympic team event. At the time they took the ice, a fifth-place finish in the pairs free segment by Knierim/Frazier had raised the possibility of the second-place American team dropping to third behind Team Japan. However, Chock/Bates would unexpectedly win the segment over Russian entries Sinitsina/Katsalapov, securing America's position over Japan. The American team ultimately won the silver medal, the first Olympic medal for both Chock and Bates. In the dance event days later, Chock stumbled midway through the performance, and they finished fourth in the segment. Bates admitted to having "mixed feelings" about the performance," but said, "it's not over yet." Fourth in the free dance as well, they finished fourth overall. Bates said after: "I think the fourth place sometimes can be one of the hardest places to finish. But the fact that there are only three spots on the podium is what makes this sport so furious and so loved by so many people and the fans at home and the athletes too. We want the competition to be strong and deep, and that’s exactly what it is."

Chock and Bates concluded the season at the 2022 World Championships, held in Montpellier. Russian dance teams were absent due to the International Skating Union banning all Russian athletes due to their country's invasion of Ukraine. Chock/Bates were third in the rhythm dance with a personal best 87.51 score. Third as well in the free dance, they took the bronze medal returning to the World podium for the first time in six years. With Papadakis/Cizeron taking the gold medal and Hubbell/Donohue the silver, the entire podium consisted of skaters from the Ice Academy of Montreal. Chock said, "it was a dream to be able to share that podium with our training mates and to be back on the podium after what feels like a very, very long time."

2022–2023 season
With another Olympic cycle, the two faced questions about retirement, to which Bates responded, "these are the most enjoyable years of our career. We're not ready to step away from competitive ice just yet." With Hubbell/Donohue retired and Papadakis/Cizeron sitting out at least the season, the two entered the 2022–23 season perceived as favorites for the World title; Chock called this "a big goal of ours, and it always has been." The two toured for three months following the Montpellier World Championships, performing in forty skating shows, and as a result, were not prepared in time to participate in a Challenger event.

For their free dance for the new season, they opted for a medley of songs by Quebec musician Jorane and a program theme inspired by Chock's vintage 1920 engagement ring, namely, "how love is connected and flows through time and transcends the physical world." In their competitive debut on the Grand Prix at the 2022 Skate America, they won the gold medal, albeit losing the free dance to domestic rivals Hawayek/Baker after their choreographic slide element was invalidated. This was their first Grand Prix gold since 2015. Following Skate America, significant alterations were made to their free dance, incorporating the music "Souffrance" by Orange Blossom while also "evolving" the concept to be "about the relationship of the spirit of fire and spirit of air and how one cannot survive without each other." They were generally considered the favorites to win the 2022 NHK Trophy, their second event, but they unexpectedly finished second behind Canadian training partners Fournier Beaudry/Sørensen, taking the silver medal. Chock acknowledged the expectations, saying, "we discussed what the season will look like for ourselves, and I think each season always offers new adversity and new obstacles. And this season is no different. Our goal remains the same: we want to win Worlds this year."

Entering the Grand Prix Final in Turin perceived to be on the back foot against top-seeded Canadians Gilles/Poirier and Italian champions Guignard/Fabbri. However, they performed well in the rhythm dance, finishing in second place and only 0.44 points behind Gilles/Poirier. Chock remarked, "based on how the season has been so far, we are just really proud of how much work we accomplished in such a short amount of time." They were second in the free dance as well, finishing 3.70 points behind Gilles/Poirier and winning their fourth Grand Prix Final silver, which Chock called "everything we hoped it would be for where we have been and the amount of work we’ve put in since Skate America and NHK."

Heavy favourites going into the 2023 U.S. Championships, Chock/Bates successfully defended their title, winning a second consecutive and fourth overall national gold medal together.

With rivals Gilles/Poirier absent from the 2023 Four Continents Championships due to Gilles' requiring an appendectomy, Chock/Bates entered the event as heavy favourites for their third title. They won the rhythm dance with a personal best 87.67, albeit with second-place Fournier Beaudry/Sørensen unexpectedly close behind with 86.28. They won the free dance by a wider margin of over five points, taking the gold medal again and setting new personal bests in the segment and overall. Bates reflected on their victories at Four Continents, saying "the first time we were very surprised we won. The second time we won, we didn't skate our best. And today, I think, was the right mix of feeling really prepared, skating really well, and still being surprised."

Programs

With Bates

With Zuerlein

Competitive highlights 
GP: Grand Prix; CS: Challenger Series; JGP: Junior Grand Prix

With Bates

With Zuerlein

Detailed results

With Bates

References

External links 

 
 Madison Chock / Evan Bates at the International Skating Union

1992 births
Living people
American female ice dancers
World Figure Skating Championships medalists
Four Continents Figure Skating Championships medalists
World Junior Figure Skating Championships medalists
Figure skaters at the 2014 Winter Olympics
Figure skaters at the 2018 Winter Olympics
Figure skaters at the 2022 Winter Olympics
Season-end world number one figure skaters
Season's world number one figure skaters
Olympic silver medalists for the United States in figure skating
Medalists at the 2022 Winter Olympics
People from Novi, Michigan
Sportspeople from Redondo Beach, California
American sportspeople of Chinese descent
American people of Native Hawaiian descent
21st-century American women